The 2014 Holy Cross Crusaders football team represented the College of the Holy Cross in the 2014 NCAA Division I FCS football season. They were led by 11th-year head coach Tom Gilmore and played their home games at Fitton Field. They were a member of the Patriot League. They finished the season 4–8, 2–4 in Patriot League play to finish in a tie for fifth place.

Schedule

References

Holy Cross
Holy Cross Crusaders football seasons
Holy Cross Crusaders football